Ágnes Kaczander (also known as Kaczander-Kiss) (born 21 November 1953 in Budapest) is a former breaststroke swimmer from Hungary, who competed at the Summer Olympics for her native country in 1972. There she came fourth in 100 m breaststroke and sixth in 200 m breaststroke.

At the European Championships she won a bronze medal in 1974 in 100 m breaststroke.

References

1953 births
Living people
Hungarian female swimmers
Olympic swimmers of Hungary
Hungarian female breaststroke swimmers
Swimmers at the 1972 Summer Olympics
Swimmers from Budapest
European Aquatics Championships medalists in swimming
20th-century Hungarian women
21st-century Hungarian women